Park Wan-su (Korean: 박완수; Hanja: 朴完洙; born 10 August 1955) is a South Korean politician serving as the Member of the National Assembly for Changwon Uichang since 2016. He was also the Secretary-General of the United Future Party (UFP) in 2020.

Prior to his parliamentary career, Park served as the Mayor of Hapcheon from 1994 to 1995 and of Changwon from 2004 to 2014. He served as the President of the Incheon International Airport Corporation from 2014 to 2015.

Early life and education 
Park was born in Tongyeong on 10 August 1955. As a son of a poor peasant, he barely graduated from primary school and was unable to continue his secondary education. He has an elder brother and 3 elder sister.

After graduated from Masan Technical High School, Park used to work at Dongkyung Electronics. He then attended to Korea National Open University and Kyungnam University.

Political career 
Park served as the Mayor of Hapcheon from 1994 to 1995. When direct elections were applied for all mayorships in 1995, he then became the last indirect Mayor.

In 2002, he ran as an independent candidate for Changwon mayorship but lost to Bae Han-sung. After Bae's election was nullified in 2004, he joined the Grand National Party and was elected. He was then re-elected in 2006 and again in 2010. He also became the first Mayor of the united Changwon, after the city was merged with Masan and Jinhae.

Following the resignation of Kim Doo-kwan prior to the 2012 presidential election, Park contested Saenuri preselection for the South Gyeongsang governorship but lost to Hong Jun-pyo. In 2014, he quitted from the Mayor of Changwon and again contested Saenuri preselection, but was also defeated to Hong. During this time, he harshly criticised Hong with issues regarding Jinju Medical Centre.

Park was appointed as the President of the Incheon International Airport Corporation in October 2014 but resigned after a year in order to run for 2016 election. He was selected as the Saenuri candidate for Changwon Uichang and defeated Kim Ki-woon of the Democratic Party.

On 2 December 2019, Park was appointed as the Secretary-General of the Liberty Korea Party. After the party was merged into the United Future Party, he was re-appointed Secretary-General.

On 22 April 2022, Park won PPP preselection for South Gyeongsang Governorship.

Election results

General elections

Local elections

Mayor of Changwon

References

External links 
 Park Wan-su on Blog
 Park Wan-su on Facebook

1955 births
Living people
Mayors of places in South Korea
People from Tongyeong
People Power Party (South Korea) politicians
Governors of South Gyeongsang Province
Kyungnam University alumni